The Mahanirmiti or Mahagenco (Maharashtra State Power Generation Company Limited - MSPGCL) formerly known as MSEB (Maharashtra State Electricity Board) is a major power generating company in the state of Maharashtra, India and a wholly owned subsidiary of Maharashtra State Electricity Board . With a total generation of 14,400 MW, it is the second largest power producing company in India. The power generated by Mahagenco is supplied to Maharashtra. It was a part of Maharashtra State Electricity Board (MSEB) until 6 June 2005.

It has been incorporated under Indian Companies Act 1956 pursuant to decision of Government of Maharashtra to reorganise erstwhile History 
of Maharashtra State Electricity Board. Mahagenco has been incorporated in June 2005.

About MAHAGENCO
Mahagenco has the highest overall generation capacity and the highest thermal installed capacity amongst all the state power generation utilities in India. In terms of installed capacity, it is the second highest generation company after National Thermal Power Corporation Limited (NTPCL). Mahagenco is the only State Utility having a very well balanced generation portfolio involving thermal, hydro & gas stations along with solar power plant. The first 500 MW plant to be installed in any State Utility belongs to Maharashtra.

Power Stations operated by Mahagenco

Thermal Power Stations Coal based

Operational
 Chandrapur Super Thermal Power Station - 2920 MW.
 Koradi Thermal Power Station - 3660 MW
 Khaparkheda Thermal Power Station - 1340 MW
 Bhusawal Thermal Power Station - 1420 MW
 Nashik Thermal Power Station - 630 MW 
 Parli Thermal Power Station - 1130 MW
 Paras Thermal Power Station, Akola - 500 MW
 RattanIndia Amravati Thermal Power Project, Amravati - 10*270MW = 2700MW

Planned / Under Development
 Chandrapur Super Thermal Power Station Project U-8,9 - 2 X 500MW
 Koradi Thermal Power Station Project U-8,9,10 - 3 X 660MW 
 Parli Thermal Power Station Project U-8 - 1 X 250MW
 Bhusawal Thermal Power Station Project U-6 - 1 X 660MW

Thermal Power Stations Gas based
 Uran Gas Turbine Power Station - 4 X 108, 2 X 120 = 672 MW

Hydro Power Stations

 Bhatghar- Dam
 Bhatsa
 Bhira - 80MW
 Dimbhe Dam
 Ghatghar Pumped Storage Hydroelectric Power Plant - 250 MW
 Kanher Dam
 Koyna Hydroelectric Project - 1,956 MW
 Manikdoh Dam
 Panshet Dam
 Pavana Dam
 Surya Dam
 Tillari Dam, Chandgad
 Ujjani Dam
 Vaitarna Dam
 Varasgaon Dam
 Veer Dam
 Warna Dam
 Yeldari Dam

See also

 Maharashtra Electricity Regulatory Commission
 Make in Maharashtra

References

External links
 Official site
 official detailed summary of all generating power plants
 official links to various power plants
 Maharashtra State Electricity Board
  Maharashtra State Electricity Transmission Company Limited
 Maharashtra State Electricity Distribution Company Limited

Electric-generation companies of India
Energy in Maharashtra
State agencies of Maharashtra
State electricity agencies of India
Companies based in Mumbai
Energy companies established in 2005
Non-renewable resource companies established in 2005
Indian companies established in 2005
2005 establishments in Maharashtra